The Red River (Greek: Το Κόκκινο Ποτάμι, Romanized: To Kokkino Potami) is a Greek-language historical television series, directed by Manousos Manousakis for Open TV in 2019, based on the homonymous historical novel by Charis Tsirkinidis, and concerns real events surrounding the Greek Genocide. 

This is the most expensive production in the history of Greek television with a total cost of over 4 million euros.

On October 6, 2019, Open TV started broadcasting To Kokkino Potami every Sunday at 9:00pm. It continued on May 24, 2020, after the break because of the COVID-19 pandemic in Greece, at 10:00pm. The last episode was broadcast on July 13, 2020.

Starred by Ioannis Papazisis, Anastasia Pantousi, Tania Tripi, Konstantinos Kazakos, Takis Vamvakidis, Tatiana Papamoschou, Argiris Pantazaras and Chara Mata Giannatou.

Plot 
The series is about a love story at the beginning of the 20th century, during the years of persecution of the Greeks of Pontus by the Ottoman Empire. The story begins in the town of Akdağmadeni in the Prefecture of Ankara, in May 1895, when the family of Georgios Pavlidis is engaged to their 9-year-old son, Miltos, to the 7-year-old Iphigenia, daughter of Michalis Nikolaidis.

An engagement of expediency, as was customary at that time, as, according to Muslim law, if a girl was engaged, she was considered dishonored and was not allowed to become a Muslim woman. The attacks of the fanatical Turks forced the two families to leave their place, with the Pavlidis family settling in Samsun and the Nikolaidis family in Constantinople. The two young people met by chance again in Constantinople, after 11 years and, without knowing the family relationship that binds them, they fell in love.

Cast

Main
Ioannis Papazisis as Miltiadis "Miltos" Pavlidis
Anastasia Pantousi as Iphigenia Nikolaidi/Ayşe Yildirim/Ayşe Ömeroğlu
Tania Tripi as Sofia Nikolaidi
Konstantinos Kazakos as Michalis Nikolaidis
Takis Vamvakidis as Georgios Pavlidis
Tatiana Papamoschou as Evgenia Pavlidi
Argiris Pantazaras as Themistoklis "Themis" Pavlidis
Chara Mata Giannatou as Vasiliki Ioannadi/Vasiliki Pavlidi
Giorgis Tsampourakis as Commandant Ali Ömeroğlu/Ilias
Stefanos Kiriakidis as Metropolitan Theoklitos
Sotiris Chatzakis as Basil Zaharoff
Dimitris Drosos as Mehmet Kartal
Kostas Xykominos as Onur Aslan
Lampros Ktenavos as Osman Poiraz
Thodoris Frantzeskos as Kerem Kartal
Giorgos Chaleplis as Mutasarrıf of Samsun
Dimitra Vitta as Arin
Pavlina Zachra as Lusin
Dimitra Sigala as Eleni Nikolaidi
Sotiris Tsakomidis as Oguz
Gerasimos Skiadaresis as Sultan Abdul Hamid II

Also main
Kelli Giakoumaki as Irini Nikolaidi/Ipek
Alexandros Moukanos as Teacher Ioannadis
Evri Sofroniadou as Melike Ömeroğlu
Giannis Thomas as Nedim Ömeroğlu
Giorgos Frintzilas as Archimandrite Grigorios
Konstantinos Tsiomidis as Panagiotis "Panaetas" Ioannadis
Spyros Sideris as Konstantinos "Kostis" Karapesidis
Sofia Alexanian as Domna Sachanidou
Petra Mavridi as Chara Mavridou
Panagos Ioakeim as Father Eytixios
Dimitris Tsolakis as Mustafa
Petros Xekoukis as Hotza
Giorgos Amoutzas as Lefteris Karakostas
Stathis Nikolaidis as Vali in Erzurum
Aias Manthopoulos as Emir
Anna Manta as Fatma
Memos Koen as Turkish refugee
Spyros Stamoulis as Murat, flag lieutenant of Vali
Dimitris Georgiadis as Russian officer
Aggelos Andriopoulos as Mustafa Kemal Atatürk
Andreas Voulgaris as Athanasios Spatharis
Giorgos Giannoutsos as Argiris

Other cast 
Dimitris Ontos
Dafni Manousou
Dimitris Topalidis
Stefanos Papatrechas
Thanasis Sarantos
Kostas Piperidis
Nikolas Pantazis
Giannis Papaioannou
Giannis Zografos
Olga Skiadaresi
Giorgos Katsoulas
Konstantinos Peslis
Christos Ntovas
Kostas Gerantonis
Marina Liggouri
Andriani Tountopoulou
Panagiotis Tsitsas
Christina Mantesi
Dimitris Tsolakis
Pantelis Dentakis
Giorgos Karaxanidis
Giannis Katsampas
Giorgos Chionidis
Anthoula Eykarpidou
Eva Argirou
Aggeliki Kintoni
Lida Samouilidou
Sumela Artavani

Filming locations 

Most of the indoors scenes were made in studios. Some scenes were shot in St. Petersburg, Russia and Paris, France. Despite much of the series being set in Pontus, Turkey many scenes that include the town of Sampsounta (Samsun) were filmed in the old town of Xanthi, in northern Greece while others were made in Trikala and Veria. Also a few scenes that include Pontians that were hanged, were shot at the former retirement home in Athens (Gyrokomeio). Also it is noted that the scenes set on the platforms of the Paris train station Gare du Nord were most probably filmed in the main railway station of Athens, Larissa Station. A fun fact is that a goat appeared while making the series and it was adopted by one of the actors who named it Potamaki.

References

External links

 at Open TV

Greek television series
2010s Greek television series
2019 Greek television series debuts
Greek-language television shows
Greek drama television series
Television shows set in Greece
Television shows set in Russia
Television shows set in France
Television shows based on books
Open TV original programming